Gérard Le Lann is a French computer scientist at INRIA.

In networking, he worked on the project CYCLADES with an intermediate stint on the Arpanet team.

Life and career 
Gérard Le Lann's career has been summarized in 1975 as follows: 
Gérard Le Lann holds French degrees, a M.S. in Applied Mathematics, an Engineering Degree in Computer Science (both from the University of Toulouse) and a Ph.D in Computer Science (University of Rennes). He started his career at CERN, Geneva (Switzerland), and joined IRIA (now INRIA) in 1972. His main areas of research are distributed dependable computing and networking, real-time computing and networking, proof-based system engineering and, more recently, mobile wireless safety-critical cyber-physical systems and networks.

His contribution to the design of Internet TCP/IPs, in its early phases, has been acknowledged.

See also 

 History of the Internet
 Internet in France
 Hubert Zimmermann
 Louis Pouzin
 Rémi Després

References

External links 

 ARPANET is now 50 years old

French computer scientists

People associated with CERN
ARPANET
Internet pioneers